The song Auf der Lüneburger Heide ("On the Lüneburg Heath") was composed in 1912 by Ludwig Rahlfs based on a poem from the collection Der kleine Rosengarten ("The Little Rose Garden") by Hermann Löns.

It is often played at folk festivals in this region of north Germany and is also frequently part of the repertoire of local choral societies.

It gained fame outside the Lüneburg Heath as a result of the 1951 film Grün ist die Heide ("Green is the Heath") with Kurt Reimann as the singer and the 1972 film of the same name in which Roy Black sings the heathland song. Various musicians have publicised their own interpretations of the song, for example the tenor Rudolf Schock on his CD Stimme für Millionen ("Voice for Millions"). The Slovenian industrial band Laibach used the song in 1988 on their cover version of the Beatles album Let It be, where under the title Maggie Mae, instead of the folk song used by the Beatles an unfamiliar version of Auf der Lüneburger Heide (first and third verses) may be heard.

Text and English translation

External links 
Link with text and melody
Auf der Lüneburger Heide by Paul Biste.
Information about the poet Hermann Löns
Auf der Lüneburger Heide on YouTube by Heino.

Regional songs
Volkslied
Lüneburg Heath